Object manipulation is a form of dexterity play or performance in which one or more people physically interact with one or more objects. Many object manipulation skills are recognised circus skills. Other object manipulation skills are linked to sport, magic, and everyday objects or practices. Many object manipulation skills use special props made for that purpose: examples include the varied circus props such as balls, clubs, hoops, rings, poi, staff, and devil sticks; magic props such as cards and coins; sports equipment such as nunchaku and footballs. Many other objects can also be used for manipulation skills. Object manipulation with ordinary items may be considered to be object manipulation when the object is used in an unusually stylised or skilful way (such as in flair bartending) or for a physical interaction outside of its socially acknowledged context or differently from its original purpose.

Object manipulators may also be practitioners of fire performance, which is essentially object manipulation where specially designed props are soaked in fuel and lit on fire.

Types

There are a very wide range of types of object manipulation. Each type of object manipulation has often been grouped together in a category of object manipulation skills. These categories are shown below. However many types of object manipulation do not fit these common categories while others can be seen to belong to more than one category.

Juggling and tossing
Juggling is a physical skill involving the manipulation of objects for recreation, entertainment or sport. The most recognizable form of juggling is toss juggling. Juggling can be the manipulation of one object or many objects at the same time, using one or many hands. Jugglers often refer to the objects they juggle as props. The most common props are balls, clubs, or rings. Some jugglers use more dramatic objects such as knives, fire torches or chainsaws. The term juggling can also commonly refer to other prop-based manipulation skills such as diabolo, devil sticks, poi, cigar boxes, shaker cups, contact juggling, hooping, and hat manipulation.
 Juggling
 Contact juggling
 Toss juggling
 Chinlone
 Cigar box (juggling)
 Devil Sticks
 Diabolo
 Flair bartending
 Footbag
 Hat manipulation

Spinning and twirling

Spinning and twirling are any of several activities performing spinning, twirling or rotating the spun object for exercise, play or performance. The object twirled can be done directly by one or two hands, the fingers or by other parts of the body. It can also be done indirectly, as in the case of devil or flower sticks, using another object or objects. The origin of twirling can be found in manipulation skills developed for armed combat and in traditional dance. The various twirling skills have become increasingly popular with many associated with circus skills.
 Chinese yo-yo
 Club swinging
 Devil sticks
 Diabolo
 Eskimo yo-yo
 Fanning
 Fire staff
 Flagging
 Freestyle nunchaku
 Glowsticking
 Hooping
 Hula hooping
Padiddling
Plate spinning
 Poi spinning
 Rhythmic gymnastics
 Rope dart
 Trick roping
 Twirling
 Baton twirling
 Color guard and winter guard
 Yo-yo

Skill toys

Skill toys are purpose-made objects that require manipulative skill for their typical use. Also often used as fidget toys, examples of such toys are:
 Astrojax
 Begleri
 Kendama
 Pen spinning
 Butterfly knife (Balisong)
 Knucklebones
 Fingerboard (skateboard)

Dexterity
Dexterity skills are here seen to be skills which are not usually associated with other categories of object manipulation. Many of these skills use items not usually associated with object manipulation. Examples are dice, cups, lighters.
 Cardistry
 Card manipulation
 Clackers
 Coin manipulation
 Dice stacking
 Isolation
 Knife throwing
 Shuffling
 Sport stacking, a.k.a. cup stacking
 Whipcracking

See also
 Burning Man, an annual event that attracts object manipulators
 Chinese jump rope
 Modern juggling culture

External links

 
Sleight of hand
Motor control